Santa Cecília is a city in Santa Catarina, in the Southern Region of Brazil. The municipality was created in 1958 out of the existing municipality of Curitibanos.

References

Municipalities in Santa Catarina (state)